Amlar is a village in the Pulwama district of the Indian union territory of Jammu and Kashmir. It lies at a distance of almost 35 km from Srinagar and 6 km from main Tral town and 5 km from Awantipora. Its nearby villages are Nowpora, Lariyar and Poshwan. On the Khandaypora (mohalla of Amlar) side, it is surrounded by a low mountain (Wudur).

See also
Jammu and Kashmir
Awantipora
Pulwama

References

Villages in Pulwama district